Bayantsagaan (rich white) is a sum (district) of Bayankhongor Province in southern Mongolia. In 2006, its population was 3,599.

References 

Populated places in Mongolia
Districts of Bayankhongor Province